Niu Ziyi (born 21 September 1999) is a Chinese footballer currently playing as a defender for Henan Jianye.

Club career
Niu Ziyi was promoted to the senior team of Henan Jianye within the 2020 Chinese Super League season and would make his debut in league game on 14 August 2020 against Guangzhou Evergrande in a 3-1 defeat where he came on as a substitute for Abduwali Ablet.

Career statistics

References

External links

1999 births
Living people
Chinese footballers
Association football defenders
Chinese Super League players
Henan Songshan Longmen F.C. players